The men's 500 metres in speed skating at the 1972 Winter Olympics took place on 5 February, at the Makomanai Open Stadium.

Records
Prior to this competition, the existing world and Olympic records were as follows:

The following new Olympic and World records was set during the competition.

Results

References

Men's speed skating at the 1972 Winter Olympics